The Victorian Equal Opportunity and Human Rights Commission is a statutory authority in the Australian state of Victoria.

It replaced the Equal Opportunity Board , set up by Victorian Premier Dick Hamer in 1975.

References

Victoria (Australia) courts and tribunals
Human rights courts